"They Killed Him" is a song written by Kris Kristofferson for his October 1986 album Repossessed.

It is a tribute to his martyred personal heroes: Martin Luther King Jr., Mahatma Gandhi, Jesus Christ, John F. Kennedy and Robert F. Kennedy. Prior to Kristofferson recording the song himself, Johnny Cash recorded the song in 1984 as one of his final singles for Columbia Records. The song was covered by Bob Dylan for his album Knocked Out Loaded, released in July 1986.

Chart performance

See also
 List of artistic depictions of Mahatma Gandhi

References

1985 songs
1986 singles
Kris Kristofferson songs
Mercury Records singles
Songs written by Kris Kristofferson
Song recordings produced by Chips Moman
Bob Dylan songs
Johnny Cash songs
Songs about the assassination of John F. Kennedy
Commemoration songs
Songs about Martin Luther King Jr.
Songs about Jesus
Cultural depictions of Mahatma Gandhi
Cultural depictions of Robert F. Kennedy